Staronikolskoye is a rural locality (a selo) and the administrative center of Staronikolskoye Rural Settlement, Khokholsky District, Voronezh Oblast, Russia. The population was 1,618 as of 2010. There are 8 streets.

Geography 
Staronikolskoye is located 17 km south of Khokholsky (the district's administrative centre) by road. Nikolskoye-na-Yemanche is the nearest rural locality.

References 

Rural localities in Khokholsky District